The Iola Champs were a minor league baseball team that played in the Oklahoma–Kansas League in 1908. They were the first professional team to be based in Iola, Kansas since 1906 and the last until 1946, when the Iola Cubs came into being. The Class-D team did not have a major league affiliation.

References

Baseball teams established in 1908
Defunct minor league baseball teams
1908 establishments in Kansas
Defunct baseball teams in Kansas
Baseball teams disestablished in 1908